The Robert Morris Colonials football program is the intercollegiate American football team for the Robert Morris University located in the U.S. state of Pennsylvania. The team competes in the NCAA Division I Football Championship Subdivision (FCS). Formerly members of the Northeast Conference, the Colonials were originally intended to compete in the 2020 season as an FCS independent before becoming a football-only member of the Big South Conference in July 2021. The Colonials would ultimately join Big South football several months ahead of schedule. After  COVID-19 caused the Big South to move its fall 2020 season to spring 2021, with two teams playing in the fall and a third not playing at all in 2020–21, the conference brought RMU into its football league for its spring 2021 season.

The school's first football team was fielded in 1994. The team plays its home games at the 3,000 seat Joe Walton Stadium. They are currently led by fifth-year head coach Bernard Clark.

History

Classifications
1994–present: NCAA Division I–AA/FCS

Conference memberships
On June 15, Robert Morris Colonials announced leaving the Northeast Conference for the Horizon League in all sports except for football starting in 2020. The football program will join the Big South Conference in football 2021. For the 2020 football team, the Colonials were originally intended to play as an FCS independent. The team's 2020 schedule was to have been played as originally set, but all games would have been considered non-conference. However, this would change due to COVID-19 disruptions; the Big South brought RMU into its football league for its rescheduled spring 2021 season.

1994–1995: Independent
1996–2019: Northeast Conference
2020–present: Big South Conference

Championships

Conference

† Co-champions

FCS playoffs results
The Colonials have appeared in the FCS playoffs one time with an overall record of 0–1.

Notable former players
Notable alumni include:
 Hank Fraley
 Tim Hall
 Tim Levcik
 Wale

Future non-conference opponents 
Future non-conference opponents announced as of January 21, 2023.

References

External links
 

 
American football teams established in 1994
1994 establishments in Pennsylvania